The Adriatic campaign of 1807–1814 was a struggle for supremacy in the Adriatic Sea between the French Navy and the British Royal Navy during the Napoleonic Wars. The early stages of the campaign saw extensive activity between rival frigate squadrons, climaxing at the Battle of Lissa in 1811 at which the last major French force was destroyed and its commander killed. The subsequent campaign was characterised by sustained raids by British warships on French and Italian convoys, warships and coastal positions across the Adriatic, culminating in the capture of several key French port cities in 1813, during the War of the Sixth Coalition.

The campaign developed following the Treaty of Tilsit in 1807, in which the Russian Navy agreed to withdraw from the Adriatic. For the next seven years, the Royal Navy sought to disrupt French and Italian military and commercial sea traffic, as well as the movement of troops and supplies to the Illyrian Provinces. Command of the Adriatic partially rested on control of the Ionian Islands, which lie outside the Straits of Otranto but could be used to blockade the passage if properly garrisoned. To this end, the French heavily fortified the island of Corfu, but were unable to consistently maintain an effective naval squadron to dispute British operations in the Adriatic. Exploiting French weakness at sea, British cruisers were able to defeat successive French squadrons sent to reinforce the region and exerted total dominance in the Adriatic and Ionian seas.

The campaign in the Adriatic has been credited with having a significant effect on the wider war through the disruption of French forces in the Balkans. It has been suggested that Napoleon intended to invade the Ottoman Empire following the War of the Fifth Coalition, but was dissuaded in part due to the difficulty of supplying a force in the region without control of the Adriatic, his attention eventually turning to Russia. The campaign also had effects on the morale and effectiveness of the French fleet, which lost some of its best commanders and frigates in the campaign, and on the Austrian advance on Italy in 1813, when French defence lines were repeatedly out-flanked by British attacks from the sea.

Timeline

The list on the left recounts the actions and operations undertaken by the squadrons operating in the Adriatic during the campaign. The list on the right provides contextual information, recounting wider events in Europe and the Mediterranean that may have had an effect on the campaign.

See also

Notes

References
 
 
 
 
 
 
 
 
 
 

Conflicts in 1807
Conflicts in 1808
Conflicts in 1809
Conflicts in 1810
Conflicts in 1811
Conflicts in 1812
Conflicts in 1813
Conflicts in 1814
Campaigns of the Napoleonic Wars
Naval battles involving the United Kingdom
Naval battles involving France
Naval battles involving Italy
History of the Adriatic Sea
19th-century history of the Royal Navy